Netflix is an American global on-demand Internet streaming media provider, that has distributed a number of original programs, including original series, specials, miniseries, documentaries and films. Netflix's original films also include content that was first screened on cinematic release in other countries or given exclusive broadcast in other territories, and is then described as Netflix original content.

Feature films

Documentaries

Specials

Upcoming

Feature films

Documentaries

Specials

Undated films

Feature films

Documentaries

Specials

References

External links
 Netflix Originals current list on Netflix (based on geolocation)

2023
Lists of 2023 films